HMS Yarmouth was a 64-gun third rate ship of the line of the Royal Navy, designed and built by Joseph Allin the younger at Deptford Dockyard. She was previously ordered to the dimensions specified in the 1741 proposals for modifications to the 1719 Establishment, but the Admiralty had very quickly concluded that these were too small, and as an experiment in 1742 authorised an addition of 6ft to the planned length, and Yarmouth was re-ordered to the enlarged design in June 1742. She was built at Deptford, where the Admiralty felt they could best observe the effectiveness of the added size, and launched on 8 March 1745.

Commissioned in February 1745 under Captain Roger Martin.  In 1747 under Captain Piercy Brett she was one of George Anson's squadron at the First Battle of Cape Finisterre. Yarmouth became a guardship in 1763, serving alternately between Chatham and Sheerness. She was recommissioned for the Leeward Islands in 1777 and sailed on 9 September. In 1781, Yarmouth was reduced in armament to become a 60-gun ship. She remained in this role until 1811, when she was broken up.

Destroying USS Randolph
On 7 March 1778 Yarmouth was attacked by the American frigate  with half the guns and likely less than a quarter the firepower. The frigate managed to cause some minor damage to two of Yarmouths topmasts and a portion of her bowsprit, then attempted to rake (fire through the length of) the ship; Randolph was firing 3 broadsides to Yarmouths one, however the 12 lb shot would have struggled to penetrate Yarmouths hull, while Yarmouths 18 and 32-pounder guns would have been able to penetrate any part of her comparatively lightly armored opponent. Randolph exploded during the engagement, likely due to a shot penetrating her magazine, killing all but four of her crew. Part of her wreckage landed on Yarmouths decks, including Randolphs ensign. Yarmouth had to repair two damaged topmasts but suffered no significant damage. Five men were killed and twelve wounded aboard HMS Yarmouth.

On Thursday the following being in chase of a ship, a man at the mast-head of Yarmouth called down to the officer on the quarter-deck. He saw something in the water abaft the beam, but could not initially recognise what it was.  With the help of a spy-glass he soon discovered 4 men seemingly standing on the water for what supported them was not visible.  HMS Yarmouth took 2 to 3 hours to eventually reach the men who were standing on a small float, and were brought aboard. It was the captain and 3 officers from the destroyed ship USS Randolph the preceding Saturday. The account the 4 men gave, was they were in the quarter cabin and were thrown into the water when the ship blew-up. The men managed to tie together a makeshift raft from the floating debris and were fortunate to survive by using a blanket to capture rainwater during their stranded five nights at sea.

Citations and references
Citations

References

 Lavery, Brian (2003) The Ship of the Line – Volume 1: The development of the battlefleet 1650–1850. Conway Maritime Press. .
 Winfield, Rif (2007) British Warships in the Age of Sail: 1714–1792. Seaforth Publishing. .
 https://web.archive.org/web/20120309230051/http://www.jfjcccmuseum.com/tjoschultz/randolph.html
 https://www.google.com.au/books/edition/Naval_Documents_of_the_American_Revoluti/VXL7ENtRDOcC?hl=en&gbpv=1&dq=HMS+Yarmouth+1745&pg=PA1175

Ships of the line of the Royal Navy
1745 ships
Ships built in Deptford